Dzmitry Anatolyevich Barazna (Dmitri Anatolyevich Borozna; born 19 November 1973 in Asipovichy) is a former Belarusian football player.

Honours
Torpedo Mogilyov
Belarusian Cup finalist: 1994/95

References

1973 births
Living people
People from Asipovichy District
Soviet footballers
Belarusian footballers
Association football defenders
CSF Bălți players
FC Ros Bila Tserkva players
Belarusian expatriate footballers
Expatriate footballers in Ukraine
FC Shakhtyor Soligorsk players
FC Torpedo Mogilev players
Yanbian Funde F.C. players
Expatriate footballers in China
FC KAMAZ Naberezhnye Chelny players
Expatriate footballers in Russia
Russian Premier League players
FC Belshina Bobruisk players
FC Osipovichi players
Sportspeople from Mogilev Region